Super League XXVI, known as the Betfred Super League XXVI for sponsorship reasons, was the 26th season of the Super League and 127th season of rugby league in Great Britain.

The 2021 season was originally scheduled to begin on 11 March 2021, however, on 14 January 2021, it was announced that all clubs had agreed to push the start date back by two weeks, to increase the chances of fans being able to attend matches.

St Helens are the reigning champions going into Super League XXVI, after successfully retaining their title against Wigan Warriors, in the Grand Final.

Super League XXVI also saw the return of the Magic Weekend, which took place at St James' Park in Newcastle, after it was cancelled in 2020 due to the COVID-19 pandemic.

Upon the expulsion of Toronto Wolfpack the previous season, a vacancy was available for the 2021 season. Six eligible teams from the Championship all applied for the vacancy. The six teams were Leigh Centurions, Bradford Bulls, York City Knights, London Broncos, Featherstone Rovers, and Toulouse Olympique. Of those six teams, Leigh were promoted following a unanimous decision by an independent panel.

Following a run of 17 successive defeats, Leigh finally got their first win of the season against Salford, winning 32–22. However, this was not enough to lift them off the bottom of the table, and they were immediately relegated back to the championship, following their 6-44 defeat to Hull Kingston Rovers on 5 September.

The sport continued to be affected by the COVID-19 pandemic. The first five rounds of matches were all played behind closed doors, and it was only from mid-May that spectators were allowed in the grounds, with attendances limited to 10,000 or 25% of the ground capacity. The Rugby Football League (RFL) anticipated that COVID-19 would have an effect, and made two important changes to the organisation of the season. 

Firstly, the league table would be decided by win percentage rather than competition points. Secondly, a set of protocols were introduced, allowing for matches to be postponed, if a team had seven or more players from the senior squad unavailable, due to either close contact or a positive COVID-19 test.

On 4 September 2021, Catalans Dragons were confirmed League Leaders Shield winners for the first time in the club's history, following their 31–30 victory against St Helens. This also gave Catalans a bye into the Semi finals of the playoffs, and a home tie against the winner of the elimination playoffs, between the lowest ranked team left in the competition, which eventually was Hull KR on 30 September 2021. Catalans won the match 28–10, with tries from Benjamin Garcia, Josh Drinkwater, Arthur Mourgue, Fouad Yaha and Joe Chan to reach their first ever Grand Final, and became the first non English team in Super League era to do so.

St Helens won their 3rd Grand Final in a row, (9th title overall), after narrowly beating Catalans Dragons 12-10 at Old Trafford on 9 October 2021.

Rule changes
As in 2020, scrums will not be formed and instead, minor ruck infringements by the defending team, will result in a repeat set of six tackles for the attacking team. Dual registration will not be allowed, but loans will be, with the minimum load period reduced to fourteen days.

Teams

Fixtures and results

Super League Europe announced in February 2021 that the matches in round 2 would be played to support retired player Mose Masoe in his rehabilitation from a serious back injury suffered during a game in 2020.

In the round 3 game on 16 April 2021 between Hull KR and Huddersfield, Ben Crooks of Hull KR, scored a try after only seven seconds, a new record, after Sam Wood missed the ball from the kick off allowing Crooks to score. Hull KR went on to win 25–24. This achievement beat not only beat the previous fastest score in Super League (St Helens' Tim Jonkers scored after 14 seconds against Wakefield Trinity during the 2002 season) but also the fastest try scored in the NRL, which was set in 2017 (Kirisome Auva'a scored after 11 seconds for Parramatta Eels against Brisbane Broncos).

Golden point extra time
If a match ends in a draw after 80 minutes, then a further 10 minutes of golden point extra time is played, to determine a winner (5 minutes each way). The first team to score either a try, goal or drop goal during this period, will win the match. However, if there are no further scores during the additional 10 minutes period, then the match will end in a draw.

Game 1 (Catalans v Hull KR) 
The first game to go to golden-point, was the round 1 game between Catalans and Hull KR on 27 March 2021. Catalans won the match 29–28, with a drop goal from James Maloney, after the scores were tied at 28-all after 80 minutes.

Game 2 (Hull FC v Warrington Wolves) 
The round 3 game between Hull FC and Warrington on 18 April 2021, finished 14-all after 80 minutes. The game then went to extra time which saw numerous drop goal attempts by both teams. With neither team able to score any points during the extra 10 minutes, the match ended as a draw for the first time since golden point was introduced into Super League.

Game 3 (Leeds Rhinos v Wakefield Trinity) 
The third game to go to golden-point, was the round 6 game between Leeds Rhinos and Wakefield Trinity on 14 May 2021. Leeds won the match 15–13, with a penalty goal from Rhyse Martin, after the scores were tied at 13-all after 80 minutes.

Game 4 (St Helens v Catalans) 
The fourth game to go to golden-point, was the round 23 game between St Helens and Catalans Dragons on 4 September 2021, during the 2nd game of the day 1 fixtures, at the Magic Weekend. Catalans won the match 31–30, with a drop goal from James Maloney, after the scores were tied at 30-all after 80 minutes (Catalans scoring three tries in the final 4 minutes of the game to come back from 30-12 down). This was the first time in Super League history that a Magic Weekend game had gone to extra time (previous draws at Magic Weekend coming before the introduction of Golden Point to Super League).

Game 5 (Leeds v Hull FC) 
The fifth game to go to golden-point, was the round 23 game between Leeds Rhinos and Hull FC on 4 September 2021, during the 3rd game of the day 1 fixtures, at the Magic Weekend. Leeds won the match 25–24, with a drop goal from Kruise Leeming, after the scores were tied at 24-all after 80 minutes. This was the second time in Super League that a magic weekend game had gone to extra time.

Game 6 (Warrington v Salford) 
The sixth game to go to golden-point, was the round 24 game between Warrington Wolves and Salford Red Devils on 11 September 2021. Warrington won the match 20–19, with a drop goal from George Williams, after the scores were tied at 19-all after 80 minutes.

Forfeited games
In June Castleford Tigers were forced to forfeit their round 12 match against St Helens. With only fourteen senior players available due to injury and COVID-19 precautions Castleford could not raise a team and forfeited the game. The RFL described it as "an unusual range of circumstances" but as less than seven of the absences were due to COVID-19 among the senior squad the match did not meet the criteria for postponement under the RFL's COVID-19 protocols.  For statistical recording and league placing the match was recorded as a 24–0 victory to St Helens.

Huddersfield became the second Super League team to forfeit a game in 2021 when the round 13 match against Castleford was cancelled on 4 July. Huddersfield announced that they were missing 20+ players due to COVID-19 and injury but as the number unavailable due to COVID-19 was less than the minimum seven absences required for the game to be postponed under the RFL COVID-19 protocols, Huddersfield had to forfeit the match.

Regular season table
When the season details were announced the original method was for the league to revert to the normal determination, (i.e. league points won). On 7 March 2021, the Rugby Football League (RFL) announced that, league positions would be determined as they were in 2020 with league position decided by win percentage (Win percentage = number of league points ÷ number of games played x 50). If two or more teams have equal win percentages, then position will be determined by points scored percentage (points scored ÷ points conceded x 100).

To qualify for the play-offs, a team had to complete 70% of their scheduled fixtures (18 matches out of 25) – unless they earned a position, in the top six through league points despite having played fewer than 18 matches.

Play-offs

The top 2 teams who finished first and second respectively in the regular season table (Catalans Dragons and St Helens respectively, had byes to the semi-finals. The four teams who finish third to sixth contested in two elimination finals, with the winner of those two games moving on to the semi finals (Hull Kingston Rovers and Leeds Rhinos respectively). Catalans became the first non English team in Super League Era, to reach the Grand Final after they beat Hull Kingston Rovers 28–10 in the first semi-final on 30 September.

Team bracket

Summary

Player statistics

Top 10 try scorers

Top 10 try assists

Top 10 goal scorers

Top 10 points scorers

Updated to match(es) played on 5 September 2021 (Round 23)

Discipline

 Red Cards

  Yellow Cards

 Updated to match(es) played on 30 August 2021 (Round 22)

Attendances

Club attendances

Top 10 attendances

End-of-season awards
The Super League end of season awards were announced on 4 October. The award winners were:

Steve Prescott Man of Steel Nominees

Notes

References

Super League XXVI
2021 in rugby league